The Spokane, Portland and Seattle Railway (SP&S) class L-4 steam locomotives were originally used by the Astoria and Columbia River Railroad (AC&R).  They became SP&S locomotives when the SP&S acquired the A&CR.

Background 
The Astoria & Columbia River Railroad ran from Portland, Oregon, to Astoria, Oregon, along the south bank of the Columbia River.  In 1896-97 several locomotives were obtained secondhand for the newly completed line.  Among these locomotives were A&CR numbers 6 and 7.  These locomotives would become the two members of Class L-4 when the SP&S bought out the A&CR in 1911.

Numbering 
Upon the acquisition of the A&CR by the SP&S both locomotives were renumbered and placed into Class L-4.  A&CR number 6 was renumbered SP&S number 53 on February 24, 1911.  A&CR number 7 was renumbered SP&S number 54 on February 24, 1911.

Disposition 
SP&S number 53 was sold to Warren CC on May 6, 1920.  SP&S number 54 was dismantled in May 1924.

References 

Rogers locomotives
4-4-0 locomotives
L-4
Steam locomotives of the United States
Standard gauge locomotives of the United States
Railway locomotives introduced in 1883

Scrapped locomotives